Mort Bay is a bay located in Morobe Province, Papua New Guinea. It was named after Commander Morton C. Mumma of the United States Navy during World War II.

References

Morobe Province